is a former Japanese football player.

Playing career
Oishi was born in Shizuoka on July 13, 1977. After graduating from Shimizu Commercial High School, he joined J1 League club Shimizu S-Pulse with teammate Tadaaki Matsubara in 1996. However he could hardly play in the match. In 1999, he moved to Japan Football League club Mito HollyHock. In 2000, he moved to Profesor Miyazaki (later Sun Miyazaki). In 2004, he moved to FC Ryukyu. He retired end of 2005 season.

Club statistics

References

External links

geocities.co.jp

1977 births
Living people
Association football people from Shizuoka Prefecture
Japanese footballers
J1 League players
Japan Football League players
Shimizu S-Pulse players
Mito HollyHock players
Estrela Miyazaki players
FC Ryukyu players
Association football defenders